Robert Horace Chamberlain  (June 16, 1838 – June 28, 1910) was an American law enforcement officer, machinist, military officer and politician who served as the eighteenth Sheriff  of Worcester County, Massachusetts.

Early life
Chamberlain was born in Worcester, Massachusetts on June 16, 1838. He was educated in public schools, and apprenticed as a machinist.

When the Civil War broke out, he enlisted in the 51st Massachusetts Infantry Regiment, and was promoted from private to sergeant. He reenlisted in the 60th Regiment and was commissioned captain of Company F.

He went on to serve as a brigadier general in the Massachusetts militia until 1876.

Family life
On January 10, 1865  Chamberlain married Esther Browning of Hubbardston, Massachusetts, they had two daughters –  Flora B. (Chamberlain) Weatherby and Mabel S. Chamberlain.

Worcester County Sheriff
In the fall of 1891, Chamberlain, after winning a lively caucus, was elected Worcester County Sheriff.  Chamberlain resigned the Sheriff's position on January 14, 1910.

Death
Chamberlain died at his home in Worcester on June 28, 1910.

Notes

1838 births
1910 deaths
Sheriffs of Worcester County, Massachusetts
Massachusetts Republicans
Politicians from Worcester, Massachusetts
People of Massachusetts in the American Civil War
Massachusetts city council members
Union Army officers